Pentacentrinae is a subfamily of crickets in the family Gryllidae.  Sometimes known as 'Silent Litter Crickets', they occur in tropical Asia, Africa and the Americas.

Tribes and Genera

These genera belong to the subfamily Pentacentrinae:
 tribe Aphemogryllini - south America
 Aphemogryllus Rehn, 1918 c g
 tribe Homalogryllini - Sri Lanka
 Homalogryllus Chopard, 1925 c g
 tribe Lissotrachelini - tropical Americas and SE Asia
 Lissotrachelus Brunner von Wattenwyl, 1893 c g
 Tohila Hubbell, 1938 c g
 Trigonidomimus Caudell, 1912 i c g b
 tribe Nemobiopsini - central America, west Malesia
 Nemobiopsis Bolívar, 1890 c g
 Pendleburyella Chopard, 1969 c g
 tribe Pentacentrini - Africa, Asia, Australia
 Apentacentrus Chopard, 1934 c g
 Orthoxiphus Saussure, 1899 c g
 Pentacentrodes Bolívar, 1910 c g
 Pentacentrus Saussure, 1878 c g
 tribe not placed
 Velapia Otte & Perez-Gelabert, 2009 c g
 † Eopentacentrus Gorochov, 2010 c g
 † Grossoxipha Vickery & Poinar, 1994 c g
 † Proanaxipha Vickery & Poinar, 1994 c g

Data sources: i = ITIS, c = Catalogue of Life, g = GBIF, b = Bugguide.net

References

Further reading

 
 

Crickets
Articles created by Qbugbot